The National Football League (NFL) was a league competition featuring football clubs from India. Founded in 1996 through the All India Football Federation (AIFF), the NFL was the first football league in India to be organized on a national scale. The AIFF then added a second division in 1997 and a third division was soon added by the governing body in 2006. The NFL was eventually replaced by the I-League for the 2007–08 season in order to professionalize the sport in India.

As well as league competition, clubs in the NFL would also participate in the two main domestic cup competitions, the Federation Cup and Durand Cup. The NFL champions would also participate in the Super Cup against the Federation Cup champion. NFL players could also participate in the state-based Santosh Trophy competition.

History
The National Football League was founded by the All India Football Federation, the governing body for football in India, in 1996. The aim of the league was to promote the development of the sport in the country. JCT Mills of Punjab won the inaugural season of the league. Then India international Bhaichung Bhutia was the league's top goalscorer with 14 goals. To supplement the Premier Division, the AIFF began the second division of the NFL in 1997. Tollygunge Agragami of Kolkata were the inaugural second division champions.

In 2001, in order to help promote the development of young Indian players, the AIFF launched the under-19 league. The inaugural season of the under-19 league would see East Bengal crowned champions. Only three seasons of the under-19 league were held in 2001, 2002–03, and 2004–05. The AIFF also fielded the India under-16 side in the league when held.

In July 2003, East Bengal made history for the NFL when they won the 2003 ASEAN Club Championship, becoming the first Indian side to win an Asian level competition. Prior to the 2006–07 season, the AIFF launched a third division, which was essentially just the qualifiers for the second division. After the season concluded, the AIFF announced that the NFL would be disbanded and replaced with a new fully-professional league, the I-League for the 2007–08 season. Dempo finished as the final NFL champions.

Sponsorship

Clubs
Played in NFL Premier Division

 Air India
 Border Security Force
 Churchill Brothers
 Dempo
 East Bengal
 Fransa-Pax
 Hindustan Aeronautics Limited
 Indian Bank
 Indian Telephone Industries
 JCT
 Kerala Police
 Kochin
 Mahindra United
 Mohammedan
 Mohun Bagan
 Punjab Police
 Salgaocar
 Sporting Goa
 State Bank of Travancore
 Tollygunge Agragami
 Vasco

Champions

Premier Division

Second Division

Third Division

See also
 List of Indian football champions
 Indian football league system
 Indian Super League

References

 
Defunct football leagues in India
Sports leagues established in 1996
Organizations disestablished in 2007
Professional sports leagues in India
India
Football leagues in India